Solomon Ataga (born 8 April 1948) is a Nigerian boxer. He competed in the men's heavyweight event at the 1980 Summer Olympics. At the 1980 Summer Olympics he lost to Teófilo Stevenson of Cuba.

References

External links
 

1948 births
Living people
Nigerian male boxers
Olympic boxers of Nigeria
Boxers at the 1980 Summer Olympics
Place of birth missing (living people)
Heavyweight boxers